Marijan Haberle (May 16, 1908 in Zagreb – March 20, 1979 in Rijeka) was a Yugoslav architect. His best known work is the Concert Hall Vatroslav Lisinski in Zagreb.

References

Literature
Horvat, Tea. Arhitektura od 1945.-1960., Socrealizam te nova pravila poslijeratne hrvatske arhitekture, u Nekretnine 3, listopad 2007.
Radović-Mahečić, Darja. Moderna arhitektura u Hrvatskoj 30'ih, Sajamski kompleks Zagrebački zbor, Zagreb, Školska knjiga, IPU, 2007.
Ivančević, Radovan. Arhitektura i urbanizam, u Stilovi razdoblja život III, Umjetnost 20.st. Zagreb, 2001., Profil
Premerl, T. u 20 godina Koncertne dvorane 'Vatroslav Lisinski, Lovro Lisičić (ur.), Zagreb, 1993.
Martinčević, J. u 20 godina koncertne dvorane 'Vatroslav Lisinski, Lovro Lisičić (ur.), Zagreb,1993., pp. 33.-36.
Premerl, Tomislav. Graditelj kontinuiteta moderne Marijan Haberle, Arhitektura 172–173, Zagreb, 1980.

External links
Entry at Enciklopedija.hr

1908 births
1979 deaths
Yugoslav architects